Samuel George Shields III (born December 8, 1987) is a former American football cornerback. He played college football at the University of Miami. Shields was signed by the Green Bay Packers as an undrafted free agent in 2010. He won Super Bowl XLV with the team over the Pittsburgh Steelers.

Early years
A native of Sarasota, Florida, Shields attended Booker High School, where he played football, baseball and ran track. In football, he played wide receiver. During his senior year, Shields had 67 receptions for 1,201 yards and 22 touchdowns. His performance helped his team make it to the Class 3A Championship game. Shields was ranked the 17th best wide receiver coming out of high school by Rivals.com. He received athletic scholarship offers from the University of Miami, Louisville, Louisiana State and Pittsburgh.

Shields also lettered twice in track and field while at Sarasota, where he was one of the state's top sprinters. He recorded a personal-best time of 10.47 seconds in the 100-meter dash, and also ran a leg on the Sarasota 4 × 100 meters relay squad that captured the state title with a time of 41.77 seconds.

College career
Shields ultimately decided to play for the University of Miami, where he started seven games in his freshman year. He recorded 37 receptions, the most by a Miami true freshman since Reggie Wayne in 1997. During his first start against Louisville, he caught three passes for 63 yards including a reception for 49 yards. His first touchdown reception came on a trick play where he caught a 37-yard pass from safety Lovon Ponder versus North Carolina. Shields also scored two touchdowns in a game against Duke. Miami earned a bowl bid to the MPC Computers Bowl against Nevada. In the game, Shields had four catches for 101 yards and caught a 78-yard touchdown pass to win the game. His performance earned him a spot as an honorable mention All-American on the freshman team by Sporting News. He was also named a selection to the 2006 Atlantic Coast Conference Academic Football Team.

During his sophomore season, Shields started five of the ten games that he participated in. On September 20, 2007, in a game against Texas A&M, Shields recorded a career-high 117 yards off six receptions. He finished the season with 27 receptions for 346 yards and three touchdowns.

Shields saw an increase in playing time and played in all 13 games during his junior year either as a receiver or on special teams. He had a season-high three catches for 32 yards against Virginia. He was also voted Miami's Special Teams Player of the Year.

During his final season with the Hurricanes, Shields switched positions from wide receiver to cornerback. During a game against Georgia Tech, he made six tackles. In a match-up between Wake Forest, Shields posted a career-high seven tackles as well as a forced fumble and recovery. He received the Nick Chickillo Most Improved Player award on defense at Miami's awards banquet.

Professional career

Green Bay Packers

2010
Shields went undrafted in the 2010 NFL Draft, but received contract offers from seven teams. Shields was projected to be a seventh round pick by the majority of NFL draft experts and scouts. He was ranked as the 28th best cornerback prospect in the draft by DraftScout.com. On April 26, 2010, the Green Bay Packers signed Shields, as an undrafted free agent, to a three-year, $1.22 million contract that includes a $7,500 signing bonus. The contract was for the rookie minimum for undrafted free agents 

Throughout training camp, Shields competed to be the nickelback or dime back against Brandon Underwood and Pat Lee. Head coach Mike McCarthy named Shields the third cornerback on the depth chart to start the regular season, behind Charles Woodson and Tramon Williams.

He made his first career start and professional regular season debut in the Green Bay Packers' season-opener at the Philadelphia Eagles and recorded three combined tackles in their 27–20 victory. Shields and safety Morgan Burnett became the first rookie defensive back tandem to start for the Packers since the AFL and NFL merged.  He was inactive for two games (Weeks 4–5) due to a calf injury. On November 11, 2010, Shields recorded a season-high two pass deflections, a solo tackle, and recorded his first career interception during a 45–7 victory against the Dallas Cowboys. He intercepted a pass by quarterback Jon Kitna that was intended for wide receiver Miles Austin in the first quarter. On December 12, 2010, Shields collected a season-high six solo tackles in the Packers' 7–3 loss at the Detroit Lions. He completed his rookie season in 2010 with 29 tackles (25 solo), six passes defensed, and two interceptions in 14 games and six starts. He also served as a kick returner and had 21 kick returns for 452-yards (21.5 YPR).

The Green Bay Packers finished second in the NFC North with a 10–6 record and earned a wildcard berth. On January 9, 2011, Shields started in his first career playoff game and recorded four solo tackles and a pass deflection during a 21–16 victory at the Philadelphia Eagles in the NFC Wildcard Game. The Packers then defeated the Atlanta Falcons in the NFC Divisional Round. On January 23, 2011, Shields started in the NFC Championship game and recorded four solo tackles, deflected two passes, made two interceptions, had a sack, and forced a fumble during a 21–14 win at the Chicago Bears. He intercepted a pass by quarterback Caleb Hanie, that was intended for wide receiver Johnny Knox, with less than 47 seconds left to seal the Packers' victory and send them to Super Bowl XLV. On February 6, 2011, Shields collected two solo tackles in the Packers' 31–25 victory against the Pittsburgh in win Super Bowl XLV. Shields injured his shoulder in the second quarter and had difficulty covering receivers due to his limited mobility.

2011
Defensive coordinator Dom Capers retained Shields as the third cornerback on the depth chart, behind Charles Woodson and Tramon Williams, to begin the regular season. He started in the Green Bay Packers' season-opener against the New Orleans Saints and collected a season-high eight combined tackles and two pass deflections in their 42–34 victory. In Week 4, he collected five combined tackles, a pass deflection, and returned an interception for a 60-yard gain during a 49–24 victory against the Denver Broncos. On October 16, 2011, he recorded five solo tackles, broke up a pass, and made an interception before exiting the Packers' 24–3 victory over the St. Louis Rams in the third quarter due to a concussion. Shields intercepted a jump ball thrown by Sam Bradford, that was originally intended for wide receiver Danario Alexander in the endzone, and was blindsided by wide receiver Brandon Gibson during the return. The hit by Gibson made direct impact with Shields' helmet and caused a concussion that sidelined him for the Packers' Week 7 victory at the Minnesota Vikings. The concussion reportedly caused him dizziness and headaches for multiple days. On December 11, 2011, he made one tackle, a season-high two pass deflections, and an interception in the Packers' 46–16 win against the Oakland Raiders in Week 14. Shields finished the season with 45 combined tackles (42 solo), 12 pass deflections, four interceptions, and a forced fumble in 15 games and seven starts.

2012
Throughout training camp, Shields competed to be a starting cornerback against Davon House, Jarrett Bush, and rookie Casey Hayward after Charles Woodson was moved to safety to replace Nick Collins. Head coach Mike McCarthy officially named Shields the third cornerback on the depth chart to start the regular season, behind Tramon Williams and Jarrett Bush. Cornerback Davon House was slated to be the starting cornerback with Tramon Williams, but sustained a shoulder injury in the preseason and was inactive for the first six regular season games.

In Week 2, Shields surpassed Jarrett Bush on the depth chart and became a starting cornerback along with Tramon Williams. On September 24, 2012, Shields recorded two combined tackles and a pass deflection in the Green Bay Packers 14–12 loss at the Seattle Seahawks in Week 3. During the closing seconds of the fourth quarter, Shields was shoved down by Seahawks' wide receiver Golden Tate while attempting to cover him during a last ditch attempt at a hail mary by Seattle. The pass was simultaneously caught by Golden Tate and Packers' safety M. D. Jennings and immediately ruled as a touchdown by one official and an interception by another. The play went under review and was ruled as a catch by head official Wayne Elliot, giving the Seattle Seahawks a 14–12 victory. The play was highly controversial and the NFL would later release an official statement acknowledging the shove by Tate that should've been called for offensive pass interference. It was dubbed the "Inaccurate Reception" and "Fail Mary" while highlighting the problems surrounding the NFL's choice to hire replacement officials during the NFL's officials strike. In Week 5, Shields collected a season-high five solo tackles and broke up a pass during a 30–27 loss at the Indianapolis Colts. Shields was inactive for six games (Weeks 7–13) after suffering a high ankle sprain during a Week 6 win at the Houston Texans. On December 23, 2012, he made one tackle, two pass deflections, an interception, and his first career sack during a 55–7 victory against the Tennessee Titans in Week 16. Shields made his first career sack on quarterback Jake Locker for an eight-yard loss in the fourth quarter. Shields finished the 2012 season with 28 combined tackles (23 solo), ten passes defensed, three interceptions, and a sack in ten games and eight starts.

The Green Bay Packers finished first in the NFC North with an 11–5 record and earned playoff berth. On January 6, 2013, Shields recorded seven combined tackles, deflected two passes, and made an interception during a 24–10 victory against the Minnesota Vikings in the NFC Wildcard Game. On January 12, 2013, he collected four solo tackles, made two pass deflections, intercepted two passes, and scored his first career touchdown in the Packers' 45–31 loss at the San Francisco 49ers in the NFC Divisional Round. During the 49ers' first offensive drive of the game, he intercepted a pass thrown by quarterback Colin Kaepernick, that was originally intended for tight end Vernon Davis, and returned it for a 52-yard touchdown.

2013
During training camp, Shields competed against Davon House and Casey Hayward for a job as a  starting cornerback. Head coach Mike McCarthy named Shields a starting cornerback to start the season, alongside Tramon Williams. He started in the Green Bay Packers' season-opener at the San Francisco 49ers and collected a season-high nine combined tackles and two pass deflections in their 34–28 loss. Shields was sidelined for two games (Weeks 11–12) after suffering a hamstring injury. He completed the 2013 season with a career-high 61 combined tackles (51 solo), a career-high 14 pass deflections, and four interceptions in 14 games and 14 starts.

2014
On March 8, 2014, the Green Bay Packers signed Shields to a four-year, $39 million contract that includes a signing bonus of $12.50 million.

Shields entered training camp slated as a starting cornerback and competed to retain the role against Davon House and Casey Hayward. Head coach Mike McCarthy officially named Shields and Tramon Williams the starting cornerbacks duo to begin the 2014 regular season. On September 28, 2014, Shields recorded three solo tackles, a season-high three pass deflections, and an interception in the Packers' 38–17 win at the Chicago Bears in Week 4. He was inactive for two games (Weeks 7–8) after sustaining a knee injuring during a Week 6 victory at the Miami Dolphins. In Week 10, Shields collected a season-high six solo tackles and deflected a pass during a 55–14 victory against the Chicago Bears. He finished the season with 40 combined tackles (33 solo), nine passes defensed, and two interceptions in 14 games and 14 starts.

2015–2016
Shields suffered a concussion while making a tackle on Jacksonville Jaguars running back T. J. Yeldon in Week 1 during the 2016 season. This marked his fourth known concussion in his NFL career. After missing the next four games still recovering, he was eventually placed on injured reserve on October 18, 2016.

2017
On February 8, 2017, Shields was released by the Packers after seven seasons with the team.

Los Angeles Rams
On March 8, 2018, Shields signed with the Los Angeles Rams after sitting out the entire 2017 season while recovering from concussions. In his first season with the Rams, Shields recorded 22 tackles and 1 interception. Shields mainly played on special teams throughout the season. In the NFC Championship Game against the New Orleans Saints with the Rams down 13-0 early in the second quarter, the Rams did a fake punt and Shields caught the ball from Johnny Hekker for 12 yards to help the Rams get their first score of the game. The Rams went on to win in overtime 26-23 to advance to Super Bowl LIII where they lost 13-3 to the New England Patriots.

NFL career statistics

Regular season

Postseason

Personal life
On October 19, 2016, police found marijuana after searching Shields' home. On January 16, 2017, Shields was officially charged with two counts of marijuana possession. On April 24, 2017, he pled no contest and received a $500 fine.

References

External links
 Los Angeles Rams bio
 Green Bay Packers bio
 

1987 births
Living people
Sportspeople from Sarasota, Florida
Players of American football from Florida
African-American players of American football
American football cornerbacks
American football wide receivers
Miami Hurricanes football players
Green Bay Packers players
Los Angeles Rams players
Unconferenced Pro Bowl players
21st-century African-American sportspeople
20th-century African-American people
Ed Block Courage Award recipients